Tropidophis melanurus, commonly known as the dusky dwarf boa, Cuban wood snake, or Cuban giant dwarf boa, is a nonvenomous dwarf boa species found mainly in Cuba. There are three subspecies that are recognized as being valid, including the nominate subspecies described here.

Description

Geographic range
T. melanurus is found in Cuba, as well as on some nearby islands, including Cayos de San Felipe (Cayo Real), Isla de la Juventud and Navassa Island. The type locality given is "l'île de Cuba."

Habitat
The preferred natural habitat of T. melanurus is forest.

Diet
T. melanurus preys upon amphibians (frogs), reptiles (lizards), birds, and mammals (rodents).

Reproduction
The mode of reproduction of T. melanurus is unclear: it has been described as oviparous, and as ovoviviparous.

Subspecies

Etymology
The subspecific name, ericksoni, is in honor of Edwin B. Erickson who assisted Schwartz in fieldwork in 1957.

References

Further reading
Boulenger GA (1893). Catalogue of the Snakes in the British Museum (Natural History). Volume I., Containing the Families ... Boidæ .... London: Trustees of the British Museum (Natural History). (Taylor and Francis, printers). xiii + 448 pp. + Plates I–XXVIII. (Ungalia melanura, pp. 111–112).
Schlegel H (1837). Essai sur la physionomie des serpens. Partie Générale. xxviii + 251 pp. AND Partie Descriptive. 606 + xvi pp. Amsterdam: M.H. Schonekat. (Boa melanura, new species, pp. 399–401). (in French).
Schwartz A, Henderson RW (1991). Amphibians and Reptiles of the West Indies: Descriptions, Distributions, and Natural History. Gainesville: University of Florida Press. 720 pp. . (Tropidophis melanurus, p. 638).
Schwartz A, Thomas R (1960). "Four New Snakes (Tropidophis, Dromicus, Alsophis) from Isla de Pinos and Cuba". Herpetologica 16 (2): 73–90. (Tropidophis melanurus dysodes, new subspecies; T. m. ericksoni, new subspecies).
Schwartz A, Thomas R (1975). A Check-list of West Indian Amphibians and Reptiles. Carnegie Museum of Natural History Special Publication No. 1. Pittsburgh, Pennsylvania: Carnegie Museum of Natural History. 216 pp. (Tropidophis melanurus, p. 194).

External links
 

Tropidophiidae
Reptiles described in 1837
Reptiles of Cuba
Snakes of the Caribbean
Fauna of Haiti